Xiuzhou District is a district in Jiaxing, Zhejiang, China, bordering Jiangsu province to the north. It is an important urban district of Jiaxing city.

Xiuzhou district takes its name from the ancient settlement, which was founded in the Spring and Autumn period, that became Jiaxing. It was named Xiuzhou district in 1999. Xiuzhou has long history and deep culture base. The Grand Canal of China, Changhong Bridge, Baoshu Pavilion and so on are the famous historical resorts. The famous Qing Dynasty scholar and poet Zhu Yizun, the biologist Cheng Shixiang, and the doctor Jiang Zhixin are all personalities in its history. Based upon the beautiful waters of this  region area together with its traditional culture, the folk painting here is colourful and full of passion for life. The Xiuzhou district has achieved the honour of being called by the title of “Hometown of Modern Folk Painting in China”, named by the Ministry of Culture.

Xiuzhou is called “a land of milk and honey, the hometown of silk”. With rapid development of the social life and economy, Xiuzhou is growing from an agricultural zone into a newly industrial area. It has been declared a “State advanced technology zone”, “National advanced physical education area”, “National advanced social security area”, “Provincial physical culture district”, “provincial culture district”. In 2006, the GDP and state budget income reach RMB 10.92 billion and RMB 1.14 billion, which increase by 14.1% and 24.6%. The ratio of three industries is 8.6: 61.0: 30.4. All these are signing a good beginning of a new round of Xiuzhou's development.

Xiuzhou district enjoys a favourable location and convenient transportation, and as a result has experienced rapid growth across many industries, particularly textiles. The expressway network in Xiuzhou is characterized as “3-horizontal, 3-bridge” and is made up by five expressways including Hu-Hang-Yong, Zha-Jia-Su expressway and Shen-Jia-Hu, Huangzhou baycross-ocean bridge expressway which are under construction. Moreover, Shanghai-Hangzhou railway, 320 national highway and the Grand Canal of China are crossing the district and connecting to Jiangsu, Zhejiang, Anhui and Shanghai four provinces and cities. All towns of Xiuzhou connect to the expressway in 15 minutes and enjoy “one hour transportation circle” to large cities around. The traffic network makrs Xiuzhou closely integrate with Shanghai and Hangzhou.

Administrative divisions
Subdistricts:
Xincheng Subdistrict (新城街道), Jiabei Subdistrict (嘉北街道), Tanghui Subdistrict (塘汇街道), Gaozhao Subdistrict (高照街道)

Towns:
Wangjiangjing (王江泾镇), Wangdian (王店镇), Xincheng (新塍镇), Honghe (洪合镇), Youchegang (油车港镇)

References

External links
Official website of Xiuzhou District Government

Districts of Zhejiang
Jiaxing